Sugar Bowl is a ski and snowboard area in northern Placer County near Norden, California along the Donner Pass of the Sierra Nevada, approximately  west of Reno, Nevada on Interstate 80, that opened on December 15, 1939. Sugar Bowl is a medium-sized ski area in the Lake Tahoe region, and is well known for its long history, significant advanced terrain, high annual snowfall and being one of the closest ski areas to the San Francisco Bay Area. Sugar Bowl's terrain is 17% Beginner, 45% Intermediate and 38% Advanced.

Sugar Bowl was founded by Hannes Schroll and a group of individual investors and is one of the few remaining privately owned resorts in the Lake Tahoe area. Sugar Bowl was the first ski area in California to install a chairlift and the first on the west coast to install a gondola lift.

History

Site real estate
The mountain peaks of Mt. Judah and Mt. Lincoln, that eventually became the ski slopes of the Sugar Bowl ski resort, were a part of the American pioneers route, back in the 1800s. A part of the California wagon trail called Roller Pass ran between Mt. Judah and Mt. Lincoln. It was one of the wagon trails through Donner Pass that was used by settlers and prospectors, on the Emigrant Trail, coming from the eastern United States across the Sierra Nevada. Today the same pass can be reached by way of the Pacific Crest Trail or a new trail created by Sugar Bowl ski resort, in 1994, called the Mt. Judah Loop trail.

The Central Pacific Railroad first began train services to Donner Pass in 1868 after the completion of the First transcontinental railroad across the United States. A new tunnel constructed two-miles (3 km) through virtually solid granite, dubbed The Big Hole tunnel, was later constructed through Mt. Judah in 1925, offering trains better protection from snow storms on the summit. These heavy snow storms and blizzards during the winters often made even train service difficult over the years through the pass, which for a period of time was known as the Overland Route.

Historian Charles F. McGlashan believed the area's economy would greatly benefit by hosting a winter carnival, and in 1894 he built the first hand-crafted Ice Palace to draw in tourists from the passenger trains. Soon after, the railroad began running "Snowball Specials" to Truckee from the Oakland Pier.

The area became more accessible to tourists in 1913 when the Lincoln Highway, the first road across the United States opened over the Donner Pass. This road was later upgraded in 1926 to U.S. Route 40, although snow plowing operations by the state of California didn't start until 1932, making travel to the area by car difficult in the winter. In 1924 Charlie Chaplin filmed scenes upon Mt. Lincoln for his silent movie classic The Gold Rush. Six hundred men were brought in by train from Sacramento to serve as extras for the comedy scene.

The land that Sugar Bowl ski resort is built on was originally purchased in 1923 by Stephen and Jennie Pilcher. During the early 1930s, before Sugar Bowl installed the first chair lift, skiers who wanted to ski the Donner Pass mountain peaks, like Mt. Lincoln, would have to climb up to the peaks on foot in order to get the chance to ski. By the mid thirties there were several rope tows dotting the hill sides of the Donner Pass area.

In 1936, Austrian ski instructors Bill and Fred Klein opened the Klein ski school, serving the Sierra Club out of the Clair Tappaan Lodge in the area and local skiers from Sacramento and San Francisco. The Klein brothers and a few other instructors they had taught, were often teaching 100 to 150 students a weekend, taking the more advanced students up to the crest of Mt. Lincoln on foot. This was partly attributed to the fact that new skiers were just venturing into the mountains more and with an improved Highway made travel easier. The term "leisure" was beginning to take hold in America during this time, after the passage of the Wagner Act and other labor laws of the 1930s. There was also an interest in skiing that can be attributed to the 1932 Winter Olympics the first to be held in the US, held in Lake Placid, New York.

Sugar Bowl
Bill Klein contacted Hannes Schroll, a famous Austrian skiing champion and ski instructor he personally knew, who was working at Yosemite at the time, about the sale of the land. Schroll, a colorful character who would always be found yodeling when he would ski, visited the area. When he and Klein saw the steep boulder field sloping down towards Donner Lake, they could not believe that it would all be covered in snow by winter. By March 1938 Schroll had made a deal with the Pilcher sisters for the purchase of the land for $6,740. But when Schroll tried to retrieve funds from his home in Austria, the war had just broken out and his funds had been taken. Schroll then had to borrow the funding to buy the property from Hamilton McGaughey, a local realtor, and ice-skating champion George Stiles. Schroll had also sent a wire via Western Union, to Walt Disney at the time while seeking funding to purchase the property, but Disney was out of town and did not receive the wire in time. Schroll then became president of the Sugar Bowl Corporation in 1938 with the help and support of Wellington Henderson, Sherman Chickering, and Donald Gregory. Shortly after Schroll began seeking other investors to help build a Slope side Tyrolean style village and ski resort, he had dreamed of, modeled after those in his home town in Kitzbühel Austria. Because they thought the fine, crystalline snow looked like sugar, Schroll and Klein decided on the name "Sugar Bowl" for the resort.

The Southern Pacific Railroad agreed to build a facility adjacent to the Norden telegraph office to accommodate 600 people, to support the opening of Sugar Bowl. Walt Disney, who had taken ski lessons from Schroll at Yosemite was approached again for funding and became a stockholder, when he gave Schroll $2,500. Schroll then changed the name of "Hemlock Peak" to "Mt. Disney" to honor Disney's support and soon after others followed suit and Schroll was able to raise $75,000 by June 1939 to help start and build the resort. Schroll also used his connections from Hollywood to convince Metro-Goldwyn-Mayer to produce a film called "Snowbirds" during November 1938, before Sugar Bowl opened to the public.

Construction of the Sugar Bowl lodge and the first chairlift installed in California, began during the summer of 1939. The lodge was designed by William Wurster and was erected with a sloping roof, so that snow would slide off towards the back side. The chairlift was designed by Henry Howard and built by the Riblet Tramway Company. Moore Dry Dock Company was hired to install the 13 towers, which were included in Howard's design, to span the 1,000 vertical feet up to the top of Mt. Disney. Miners were brought in from Nevada City and used shovels and picks and sometimes dynamite, to clear away trees and dig footings for the towers by hand. Lava formation in the mountain was encountered during construction and some of the footings had to be set within it. Sugar Bowl opened on December 15, 1939, but it hadn't snowed enough to go skiing yet, so a makeshift ice rink the size of a tennis court was quickly set up for everyone to enjoy. Two weeks later on January 4, 1940, a blizzard struck Sugar Bowl and the skiing at Sugar Bowl began, with train load after train load of skiers coming in unexpected numbers.

After opening

Towards the end of the very first ski season at Sugar Bowl, Schroll held the inaugural Silver Belt race in April 1940. The race was won by Gretchen Fraser and Friedl Pfeifer. Prior to the international World Cup ski competition, the Silver Belt race was considered one of the most challenging of that era and often attracted the top European and American skiers. Jannette Burr and Christian Pravda were the only competitors to win the race three different times, and other notable winners included Alf Engen, Tom Corcoran, Buddy Werner, Willy Favre, Jean Saubert, Barbara Cochran, Jack Reddish, Penny Pitou, Anne Heggtveit, Dick Buek, Jill Kinmont, Andrea Mead Lawrence, Gordon Wren and Cynthia Nelson, who won the last event, which was held in 1975.

Because Sugar Bowl had the first chair lift in the Sierras with full lodge accommodations, the resort quickly became a popular skiing destination for many notable guests and Hollywood personalities.  Storytelling, dancing on the open deck, and wearing suit jackets to dinner was the norm during this colorful time. Guests such as King Vidor who directed such movies as The Champ, War and Peace and the Kansas sequences in The Wizard of Oz. Other guests included Robert Stack, Norma Shearer, Margaret Sullavan, Jean Arthur, James Bryant Conant, Doris Duke, Claudette Colbert, Lowell Thomas, Leland Hayward, Errol Flynn, Sterling Hayden, Marilyn Monroe, and Walt Disney. Robert Stack, who grew up in Lake Tahoe, could often be found skiing down with Schroll, who could also yodel, was considered a local. Actress Janet Leigh was actually discovered at Sugar Bowl ski resort by actress Norma Shearer. Leigh's father, Fred Morrison, the front desk clerk, had his daughter's photo sitting at the front desk when the actress checked in at the lodge. Shearer took the photo back to Hollywood and MGM soon contacted Leigh to sign a contract. She went on to star in such films as Alfred Hitchcock's 1960 thriller Psycho, The Manchurian Candidate, and the Civil War drama The Romance of Rosy Ridge. Greta Garbo's last film appearance was in the movie Two-Faced Woman filmed at Sugar Bowl in the spring of 1941, along with costars Melvyn Douglas, Constance Bennett, Roland Young, and Ruth Gordon. Sugar Bowl was also featured in the 1941 Disney cartoon The Art of Skiing in which Goofy goes to Sugar Bowl to learn how to ski. Schroll is noted for the yodel that goofy makes in the cartoon known as the Goofy holler.

But just as quickly as it all started, it came to a temporary halt when the US became involved in World War II. The resort had few guests and Schroll retired as president of Sugar Bowl in 1945 after the war and moved to San Francisco. Gone, too, were the "Snowball Specials", the Southern Pacific Railroad had decided to stop train passenger service to Donner Pass during and after the War and the Norden station became a place for storage of equipment.

After the war

Klein returned to Sugar Bowl after the war, in 1946, as Sugar Bowl's ski school director and held the position until 1957. Klein believed skiing was a fashionable sport and started his own ski shop, out of the Sugar Bowl lodge, selling the latest ski equipment and clothing on the market. Howard Head, who invented the first metal skis, asked Klein to test his new laminate skis he was developing at the time and then offered Klein a one-fourth interest in his ski company. Klein declined the offer at the time and remained at Sugar Bowl, but later said he regretted the decision, after Head's company became one of the leading ski manufacturers in the U.S.

The second chairlift to be installed at Sugar Bowl was in 1950, the new lift had a double chair and was installed going up Mt. Lincoln, opening up much needed new terrain for skiers, that for years had to be hiked up to on foot. Two years later in 1952 it was time to replace the original ski lift going up Mt. Disney and when Heron of Denver replaced the lift the state assigned the new lift with Permit #8. The original lift had been installed before permits were even assigned or it would have been issued permit #1 in 1939 when it was first constructed.

Due to the original design plans of Sugar Bowl, it was determined by Jerome Hill and others that a Gondola would be necessary to move people better into the resort. The following year in 1953 Heron of Denver installed "The Magic Carpet", the first aerial tramway on the west coast. The Gondola has since been rebuilt and upgraded twice since the original installation, by CTEC. It takes people from a parking lot on the north side of the railroad line, crosses over the tracks just past the west portal of the Southern Pacific's Tunnel 41, and deposits people in the main village.

The 1960s would usher in a whole new era in skiing in the Sierra Nevada and Sugar Bowl after the 1960 Winter Olympics were held in nearby Squaw Valley. Disney directed the Pageantry for the games, which today are better known as the Opening and Closing Ceremonies. The story goes that Alex Cushing, who co-founded Squaw Valley, was on vacation at Sugar Bowl in 1946 when he met Wayne Poulsen, who then invited him to look into opening a ski resort together.

Skiing was becoming larger, more popular and better, with over 3 million skiers hitting the slopes each year and new equipment entering the market. Filmmaker Warren Miller came to Sugar Bowl in 1963 to shoot scenes for his film "The Color Of Skiing", which were later added to his film "Fifty", which included scenes from 50 year's worth of ski footage, that was released in 1999. Junior Bounous who was the ski school director at Sugar Bowl in 1958  and the first American born Ski School Director in the US, was also featured in over 10 Warren Miller films. Bounous would later go on to be inducted into the U.S. National Ski and Snowboard Hall of Fame in 1996.

By 1964 Interstate 80 was constructed over the crest of Donner Pass to replace the older Historic U.S. 40, which today is named Donner Pass Road.

Recent history
Sugar Bowl is one of the oldest and longest running ski resorts on the west coast, having been in operation for over 70 years. During the last several decades Sugar Bowl ski resort has replaced its older double chair lifts and added new quad lifts to open up new trails on its 4 mountain peaks, Mt. Judah, Mt. Lincoln, Mt. Disney and the Crows Nest Peak. A 10-year expansion of the resort began in 1992, with addition of a new parking lot and a lodge at the base of Mt. Judah, a pedestrian village and more off-slope facilities.

Another addition came in 1999 with the founding of the Sugar Bowl Academy (SBA), a college preparatory high school for competitive skiers. The School Academy was co-founded by Jim Hudson, Barbara Sorba and Dr. Patricia "Tricia" Hellman Gibbs, former member of the U.S. Ski Team and daughter of Warren Hellman. SBA recently celebrated its 20th anniversary. The most notable alumni graduates from the ski academy have been Katie Hitchcock, Luke Winters and Hannah Halvorsen who have been members of the  U.S. Ski Team.

A new ski race was added at Sugar Bowl in 2004, modeled after the Silver Belt races of the past that descends down the same slopes of Mt. Lincoln, called the Silver Belt Banzai.  The race differs from the traditional Silver Belt races that were held during the 1940s, in that 4 to 6 skiers or snowboarders race down the hill at the same time, known as a skier cross-style format.  2010 Vancouver Olympic Games competitor Daron Rahlves and his sister Shannon, both won the event back to back in 2009 and 2010 for the men and women.

Ski trails
Mt. Judah is named after Theodore Judah who was the railroad design engineer for the Central Pacific Railroad, who surveyed and planned the route that the rail road tracks follow through Donner Pass to Nevada. Mt. Disney is named in honor of Walt Disney, an initial stockholder when Sugar Bowl was being constructed.

Bill Klein’s Schuss is a moderately steep blue square towards the bottom of Mt. Lincoln, named in honor of Bill Klein, once the ski school director and ski shop owner at Sugar Bowl ski resort. He went on the initial trip with Schroll in 1937 to look at the land and mountain peaks that would one day become the Sugar Bowl ski resort.

Jerome Hill is named after Sugar Bowl stockholder Jerome E. Hill, who was responsible for paying for and installing "The Magic Carpet" gondola at Sugar Bowl ski resort.

In addition, many of the trails and locations on the mountain are named after streets and landmarks in San Francisco, such as Nob Hill, Market Street, and Montgomery.

In popular culture
In the 1941 Goofy cartoon The Art of Skiing, Goofy skis at Sugar Bowl.

References

External links
Sugar Bowl official web site

Sports venues in Placer County, California
Ski areas and resorts in California
Companies based in Nevada County, California
Tourist attractions in Placer County, California